Tyler Coyle (born November 15, 1998) is an American football safety for the Dallas Cowboys of the National Football League (NFL). He went undrafted in the 2021 NFL Draft. He played college football at Connecticut and Purdue.

Early years
Coyle attended Windsor High School. As a junior, he had 28 receptions for 700 yards and 11 TDs, winning Class L-Small state championship. As a senior, he had 29 receptions for 741 yards and 12 TDs, advancing to Class L semifinals. He was named First-team New Haven Register All-Star, was named to the All-Hartford Courant team and the Walter Camp Football Foundation All-Connecticut.

He was also an outstanding track athlete, winning six high school championships. Coyle also played basketball in high school.

College career
As a redshirt freshman, he appeared in all 12 games, with 9 starts. He led UConn with two interceptions, was second with seven passes defended and five pass breakups, and was third with 67 tackles. He also scored his first collegiate touchdown against Temple on a 34-yard interception return.

As a sophomore, he played in all 12 games, making 10 starts. He led UConn and was fourth in the AAC with 107 total tackles. He also returned 13 kickoffs at 22.1 yards per return.

As a junior, he played in 11 games, leading UConn with 86 total tackles. He also forced two fumbles, had 3.5 TFL, one interception (returned 52 yards for a touchdown), nine PBUs, and 54 solo stops.

As a senior and graduate transfer at Purdue, he played in 3 games, with one pass defensed and 13 total tackles (10 solo).

Professional career

At Purdue's pro day, he ran a 4.41 40-yard dash. Other sources have his 40-yard time as 4.36. Nevertheless, Coyle went undrafted in the 2021 NFL Draft. He signed with the Dallas Cowboys as a UDFA and was waived on August 31. He was re-signed to the practice squad the next day. He made his NFL debut on December 2, 2021, playing 17 special-teams snaps against the New Orleans Saints. He signed a reserve/future contract with the Cowboys on January 18, 2022.

On August 30, 2022, Coyle was waived by the Cowboys and signed to the practice squad the next day. He signed a reserve/future contract on January 24, 2023.

References

External links
Purdue Boilermakers bio

1998 births
Living people
Players of American football from Connecticut
People from Windsor, Connecticut
American football safeties
UConn Huskies football players
Purdue Boilermakers football players
Dallas Cowboys players